Meron Amanuel Mengstab (born 6 November 1990) is an Eritrean former cyclist.

Major results
2012
 Tour of Rwanda
1st Stages 2 & 6
2013
 2nd Road race, National Road Championships
 3rd Overall Tour of Eritrea
1st  Points classification
2016
 5th Fenkil Northern Red Sea Challenge
 8th Overall Tour Eritrea
1st  Points classification

References

External links

1990 births
Living people
Eritrean male cyclists